The Porto Alegre City Council is the Legislative branch of Porto Alegre. It is composed of 36 councilors who are elected by an open list election. The Council serves as a balance of power against the mayor, as Porto Alegre has a strong mayor-council type of government. Porto Alegre City Council oversees all Executive agencies, departments, and audits municipal public accounts. It has sole authority to decide if Mayor or Deputy Mayor may leave Porto Alegre for a period longer than five days. The Council also approves the Budget Bill. There is no term limit.

Current Speaker of the Council is Humberto Goulart (PDT). There also are following offices: First Deputy Speaker, Luiz Braz (PSDB); Second Deputy Speaker, Margarete Moraes (PT); First Secretary of the Council, Haroldo de Souza (PMDB); Second Secretary, Elias Nunes Vidal (PPS); and Third Secretary, Valdir Caetano da Silva (PL). Current Majority Leader is Clênia Maranhão, PPS.

There are six committees overseeing several subjects of the city. Committee membership is defined by party breakdown. Members of committees are assigned by party leaders. Committees generally meet in the morning, as afternoons are reserved to floor sessions.

History
The very first City Council meeting was on September 6, 1773, when members of the Viamão Council met in the Vila de Nossa Senhora da Madre de Deus de Porto Alegre, former name of Porto Alegre, ordered by then-governor José Marcelino de Figueiredo. Members of the first Porto Alegre City Council were Domingos Moreira (Speaker), Manoel Velloso Tavares, Domingos Gomes Ribeiro, José Alves Velludo, and Ventura Pereira Maciel. In the early years, the City Council had both judicial and legislative powers.

In 1828, there had been a major change the way City Council was set up. Porto Alegre had 10,000 inhabitants, and 400 voters, who elected the new nine-member City Council. Under the rule of the Empire of Brazil, there was no mayor-like office, and activities of City Council were scrutinized by the Provincial Assembly. At that time, City Council had attributions that today are mayor's ones, like public works, police services, and tax collection. In 1864, it had begun the building of the first Council Hall in an open lot between Rua da Ponte (currently Riachuelo Street) and Pedro II Square (currently Marshall Deodoro Square). This building was destroyed by fire on November 19, 1949 and the lot is now the seat of Rio Grande do Sul Court of Justice. 1873 was the year of the centennial and the members of Council were João Carlos Augusto Bordini, Joaquim Francisco Dutra Júnior, João Rodrigues Fagundes, Antônio Manuel Fernandes, Luís da Silva Flores Filho, João Pinto da Fonseca Guimarães, José Martins de Lima, Manuel Soares Lisboa and, Firmínio Martins de Oliveira Prates.

By the deposition of monarchy, there were 8 councilmen: João Antunes da Cunha Neto (speaker), Felicíssimo Manoel de Azevedo, Bibiano Dias de Castro, João da Mata Coelho, José Domingos da Costa, Antônio da Azevedo Lima, Guilherme Shell and, Rafael Gonçalves Ventura. After enactment of the Brazilian Constitution of 1891, City Council was responsible of auditing municipal public accounts, analyzing budget bills and, tax-related matters. At this time, there had been no opposition within City Council, as the PRP dominated state's political scene. The first oppositionist ever elected was a member of defunct Federalist Party in 1916. When Getúlio Vargas took over the rule in 1930, all city councils in Brazil were closed. Only in 1934, the city councils were re-opened. During this time, City Council was made up of 11 councilmen with annual sessions no longer than two months. This structure lasted until 1937, when that City Council was replaced by a Technical Administration Council.

In 1947, a new State Constitution was signed into law and City Council was authorized to have 21 members; these members now started out receiving monthly income paid up by city treasury, this led to increase of middle class representation. Between 1947 and 1949, Council sessions are hosted in today's City Hall. In 1949, City Council moved into José Mountary Building. When the military staged a coup in 1964, multi-party system was abolished, being replaced by a two-party system.

In 1988, a new Brazilian Constitution was enacted, granting powers to cities but, creating a rigid form of government for cities; in this constitution cities are federative units, unlike former constitutions that granted states full rights to legislate over municipal forms of government.

Membership to City Council
As of October 7, 2006, these are the members of Porto Alegre City Council. Councilmen are sorted out by party, then by last name.

Committees of City Council
There are six committees with jurisdiction all over municipal affairs. Committee's works are regulated by the Porto Alegre City Charter (Chapter V, Section III) and the Porto Alegre City Council Rules of Procedure (Title II, Chapter II).

Committee on Constitution and Justice
Committee on Constitution and Justice (CCJ) oversees legal status before the City Charter of every bill in the Council. This committee drafts final versions of every bill in the Council before being voted in the floor. CCJ has an appellate jurisdiction on decisions of the Speaker and its deputies. Ibsen Valls Pinheiro (PMDB) is the Committee Chairman and Paulo Odone Ribeiro (PPS) is the Deputy Committee Chairman. Membership to CCJ:

Committee on Economy, Treasure, Budget, and Mercosur
Committee on Economy, Treasure, Budget, and Mercosur (CEFOR) oversees tax, economy and, budget affairs. CEFOR has sole authority to oversee public spendings as defined by budget bill. CEFOR drafts final versions of Budget, appropriation bills. Maristela Meneghetti (DEM) is the Committee Chairwoman and Adeli Sell (PT) is the Deputy Committee Chairman. Membership to CEFOR:

Committee on Urbanization, Transportation, and Housing
Committee on Urbanization, Transportation, and Housing (CUTHAB) has jurisdiction on street, places naming, public works, municipal assets allocation, public transportation and, related affairs. Elói Francisco Pedroso Guimarães (PTB) is the Committee Chairman and Clênia Leal Maranhão (PPS) is the Deputy Committee Chairwoman. Membership to CUTHAB:

Committee on Education, Culture, and Youth Affairs
Committee on Education, Culture, and Youth Affairs (CECE) has jurisdiction on educational affairs, sport facilities and, youth-related initiatives. Manuela Pinto Vieira d'Ávila (PCdoB) is the Committee Chairwoman and Maristela Maffei (PSB) is the Deputy Committee Chairwoman. Membership to CECE:

Committee on Consumer and Human Rights
Committee on Consumer and Human Rights (CEDECONDH) oversees consumer relations, human rights violation and, public safety. Carlos Atílio Todeschini (PT) is the Council Chairman and Jorge Antônio Dornelles Carpes (PTB) is the Deputy Committee Chairman. Membership to CEDECONDH:

Committee on Health and Environment
Committee on Health and Environment (COSMAN) has jurisdiction on public-funded healthcare, sanitary inspection, sewage services and, environmental protection. João Carlos Cavalheiro Nedel (PP) is the Committee Chairman and Cláudio José de Souza Sebenelo is the Deputy Committee Chairman. Membership to COSMAN:

See also
 Government of Porto Alegre
 Mayor of Porto Alegre

References
"A Câmara conta sua história." Câmara Municipal de Porto Alegre. 7 Oct. 2006 <http://www2.camarapoa.rs.gov.br/default.php?p_secao=118>.

Notes

External links
Porto Alegre City Council (in Portuguese)

Municipal chambers in Brazil
Government of Porto Alegre
Porto Alegre